Ranz is an automotive marque owned by Tianjin FAW Toyota Motor Co., Ltd. which specialises in electric cars. It was launched in April 2013.

History
The Ranz marque was unveiled in March 2013.

The first Ranz concept car was unveiled to the public at the Shanghai Auto Show in April 2013.

The Ranz EV, an electric saloon for the Chinese market based on the Toyota Corolla, was launched at the November 2014 Guangzhou Motor Show.

References

Vehicle manufacturing companies established in 2013
Cars of China
FAW Group brands